

Wilhelm Meentzen (19 March 1915 – 8 May 2001) was a German admiral in the Bundeswehr. He commanded the destroyer Zerstörer 3 (D172), formerly USS Wadsworth (DD-516), from October 1959 until January 1961. During World War II, Meentzen commanded Kreigsmarine torpedo boats and received the Knight's Cross of the Iron Cross of Nazi Germany.

Awards and decorations
 Spanish Cross in Bronze with Swords (6 June 1939)
 Iron Cross (1939) 2nd Class (23 December 1939) & 1st Class (21 November 1940)
 German Cross in Gold on 5 May 1944 as Kapitänleutnant on Torpedoboot T-24/4. Torpedoboots-Flottille
 Knight's Cross of the Iron Cross on 30 October 1944 as Kapitänleutnant and commander of Torpedoboot T-24
 Order of Merit of the Federal Republic of Germany (25 May 1973)

References

 
 
 

1915 births
2001 deaths
People from Emden
People from the Province of Hanover
Reichsmarine personnel
Kriegsmarine personnel of World War II
Bundesmarine admirals
German prisoners of war in World War II held by France
German military personnel of the Spanish Civil War
Recipients of the Gold German Cross
Recipients of the Knight's Cross of the Iron Cross
Commanders Crosses of the Order of Merit of the Federal Republic of Germany
Vice admirals of the German Navy
Military personnel from Lower Saxony